Queen Nazarene or Queen Nazareen is an old English card game recorded by Charles Cotton as early as 1674. It is an ancestor of Newmarket.

Rules 
The following is the description in Cotton's 1674 rules:

The rules were reprinted, with minor changes, in all editions of The Compleat Gamester until the 8th edition in 1754.

References

Bibliography 
 Cotton, Charles (1674) The Compleat Gamester. London: A.M.
 Johnson, Charles (1754). The Compleat Gamester. 8th edn. London: J. Hodges.
 Parlett, David (1991). A History of Card Games, OUP, Oxford. 

17th-century card games
English card games
French deck card games
Multi-player card games
Stops group